Kočevske Poljane is a village in the Municipality of Dolenjske Toplice in Slovenia. The area is part of the historical region of Lower Carniola. The municipality is now included in the Southeast Slovenia Statistical Region. The village includes the hamlets of Gorica ( or Büchel bei Pöllandl) and Trnovec (or Trnje).

Name

The name of the settlement was changed from Poljane to Kočevske Poljane in 1953. In the past the German name was Pöllandl.

History
Pöllandl was a village settled by Gottschee Germans inside the Gottschee region until 1941. During the Second World War its original population was resettled by the German authorities. However, some Gottscheer families managed to resist and prevent expulsion, and most of these collaborated with the Partisans of the Liberation Front of the Slovene People, which had a base (Baza 20) nearby. Their dialect Gottscheerish was forbidden after World War II, and so today there are only a few people left that speak it.

Church
The local parish church is dedicated to Saint Andrew and belongs to the Roman Catholic Diocese of Novo Mesto. It dates to the 17th century. A second church belonging to the parish, built just north of the settlement in the hamlet of Gorica, is dedicated to Mary Help of Christians and was a pilgrimage church built in the late 17th century. The cemetery is one of only ten in the Kočevje region to have (mostly) preserved the tombstones of the Gottschee Germans.

Notable people
Notable people that were born or lived in Kočevske Poljane include the following:
August Schauer (1872–1941), parish priest at Koprivnik for over 30 years and editor of the Gottscheer Kalender (Gottschee Almanac) from 1925 to 1941

References

External links

Kočevske Poljane on Geopedia
Pre–World War II map of Kočevske Poljane with oeconyms and family names

Populated places in the Municipality of Dolenjske Toplice